Gerard Paul Greenhalgh (born 12 April 1979), known professionally as Paul Nicholls, is an English actor. He is known for his roles as Joe Wicks in the BBC soap opera EastEnders, DS Sam Casey in the ITV drama Law & Order: UK, and Steve Bell in the Channel 4 drama Ackley Bridge.

Career
Nicholls made his television debut in 1990 at the age of 10, in Children's Ward. In 1994, he appeared in the BBC children's drama Earthfasts and The Biz, a teenage performing arts drama filmed at Hampton Court. In 1996, he appeared in an episode of Out of the Blue. Later that year, Nicholls began portraying the role of Joe Wicks in the BBC soap opera EastEnders, a role which he played until 1997.

Nicholls appeared in several teenage stage roles, notably as Aladdin in Aladdin - Genie of the Ring at the Central Theatre in Chatham (1996–1997), and he made his London stage debut as Billy Fisher in the 1998 production of Billy Liar, at the King's Head Theatre in Islington.

Nicholls' 2008 career began as the character Robert Fielding in Harley Street alongside Suranne Jones. He also played Harry Keegan in Secret Diary of a Call Girl, Judas in another BBC series entitled The Passion, and appeared in A Thing Called Love. He then appeared in the 2012 feature film Life Just Is.

Nicholls also appeared as Simon Marshall in the BBC hospital drama serial Holby City between May and July 2012, and played Cal Beckett in Channel 4's crime thriller, The Fear. He played the role of DS Sam Casey in ITV's Law & Order: UK until the end of series 7 in 2013. 

From 2017 to 2018, Nicholls portrayed the role of Steve Bell in the Channel 4 drama Ackley Bridge. From September to October 2018, Nicholls starred alongside Iwan Rheon in Foxfinder at the Ambassadors Theatre. In January 2019, Nicholls took over the role of Raymond from Mathew Horne in the British touring production of Rain Man.

Personal life
Nicholls lives in Hampstead, London.

Nicholls married Chantal Brown in 2008. They divorced in 2015.

In July 2017, Nicholls was badly injured while on holiday in Thailand after falling from a waterfall in Ko Samui. As his mobile phone was broken, he was left stranded at the bottom of the waterfall for three days, and only rescued by volunteer rescuers, police and medics after locals alerted police to the motorcycle he had travelled on, which lay abandoned nearby. He was later taken to hospital, suffering from broken legs and a shattered knee. Nicholls' agent said he was "recovering well".

In May 2021, Nicholls revealed that he suffered a stroke in 2018. The stroke caused him to experience deep depression, which led to him becoming addicted to dihydrocodeine and cocaine throughout 2020. He confirmed that he was attending Narcotics Anonymous meetings and was glad to be in recovery, stating that if he were to relapse again, he "would die".

Filmography

References

External links

1979 births
Living people
Actors from Bolton
English male child actors
English male soap opera actors
English male film actors
English male stage actors
English male musical theatre actors
Male actors from Greater Manchester
20th-century English male actors
21st-century English male actors